Stavros Flatley are a British-Greek Cypriot father-son dance duo consisting of Demetrios and his son Michalakis 'Lagi' Andreas, best known for appearing on the third series of Britain's Got Talent in 2009. They reached the final of the series, finishing fourth behind Diversity, Susan Boyle and Julian Smith.

The name of their act is derived from Irish-American dancer Michael Flatley, best known for Irish dance shows including Riverdance and Lord of the Dance, and Stavros, a Greek kebab shop owner with fractured English who was portrayed by Harry Enfield on Channel 4's television comedy and music show Saturday Live.

Following their appearance on Britain's Got Talent, the act appeared in the second series of Sugar Free Farm.

Appearances 
 Britain’s Got Talent (2009)
 Britain's Got Talent: The Champions (2019)
 Britain’s Got Talent Christmas Spectacular (2020)

Career 
Stavros Flatley started their careers when Demetrios owned a Greek restaurant in North London. The cabaret performances were especially successful. It was at the restaurant that Demetrios developed the Stavros Flatley duo.

References

Britain's Got Talent contestants
British people of Cypriot descent
British people of Greek Cypriot descent
British people of Greek descent
British dancers